Heymer or Haymar may refer to:

 Haymar, Syria, village in Aleppo Governorate, Syria
 Haymar, Iran, village in Gilan Province, Iran
 John E. Heymer, British police officer (born 1934)
 Armin Heymer, ichthyologist who classified the Yellow-headed goby